The 1876–77 Harvard Crimson football team represented Harvard University in the 1876 college football season. They finished with a 3–1 record. The team captain was Nathaniel Curtis.

On November 18, 1876, the second Harvard–Yale football rivalry game was played before a crowd of approximately 2,000 people at Hamilton Park in New Haven, Connecticut. Walter Camp played for Yale, which won the game 1–0.

Schedule

References

Harvard
Harvard Crimson football seasons
Harvard Crimson football